The House of Representatives (Korean hangul: 민의원, hanja: 民議院) was the lower house of the National Assembly of South Korea during its First and Second Republics. The House of Representatives was established by the Constitution of the First Republic of Korea, which established a bicameral legislature. However, as the House of Councillors was never established during the First Republic, the House of Representatives acted as the only house in a unicameral legislature until the House of Councillors was actually established in the Second Republic.

Speakers

Deputy speakers

See also
National Assembly
House of Councillors

References

Government of South Korea
History of South Korea
South Korea
Defunct lower houses
1960 establishments in South Korea
1961 disestablishments in South Korea
Organizations established in 1960
Organizations disestablished in 1961